Mule Lake is a lake in Cass County, Minnesota, in the United States.

Mule Lake was named from the resemblance of its outline to a mule's head.

See also
List of lakes in Minnesota

References

Lakes of Minnesota
Lakes of Cass County, Minnesota